Engström,  Engstrøm and Engstrom are surnames of Swedish and Norwegian origin. The name may refer to:

Adolf Engström (1855–1924), Finnish engineer, businessman and vuorineuvos
Albert Engström (1869–1940), Swedish artist, author and member of the Swedish Academy
Carl Engström (born 1991), Swedish basketball player
Carl Gunnar Engström (1912–1987), Swedish physician and innovator
Christian Engström (born 1960), Swedish computer programmer, activist and politician
David Engström (born 1990), Swedish footballer
Désirée Pethrus Engström (born 1959), Swedish Christian Democratic politician
Gunvor Engström (born 1950), Swedish business personality and civil servant
Hillevi Engström (born 1963), Swedish politician of the Moderate Party
JH Engström (born 1969), Swedish artist
Johan Engström (born 1976), Swedish professional darts player
Josefine Engström, Swedish ski-orienteering competitor and World Champion
Lilly Engström (1843–1921), Swedish pedagogue and women's rights activist 
Marie Engström (born 1953), Swedish Left Party politician
Mats Engström (born 1955), Swedish businessman and chairman
Odd Engström (1941–1998), Swedish politician
Patrik Engström (born 1968), Swedish politician
Robin Engström (born 1971), Swedish drummer of the heavy metal band Morgana Lefay
Stig Engström (1934–2000), Swedish graphic designer and suspected murderer
Thomas Engström (born 1975), Swedish novelist and journalist
Tomas Engström (born 1964), Swedish auto racing driver
Victor Engström (1989–2013), Swedish bandy player

Engstrom
Arnell Engstrom (1897–1970), American businessman and politician
Art Engstrom (1898–1953), American football player
Dale Engstrom (1917–2018), American businessman and politician
Elizabeth Engstrom, American speculative fiction writer
Elton Engstrom Jr. (1935–2013), American lawyer, businessman, writer, and politician
Elton Engstrom Sr. (1905–1963), American businessman and politician
Elmer William Engstrom (1901–1984), American engineer and corporate executive
Eric Engstrom (1959–2020), American software engineer
Jean Engstrom (1920–1997) American actress
Jena Engstrom, American former television actress
Molly Engstrom, American ice hockey player
Ted Engstrom, American Christian leader and former head of Youth for Christ International and World Vision International
Thelma Engstrom (1905–1957), American educator, journalist, and politician
Victor E. Engstrom (1913–2000), American philatelist known for his knowledge and collections of Nordic stamps
The Engstrom political family of Southeast Alaska, including:
Cathy (Engstrom) Muñoz (born 1964), American politician; member of the Alaska House of Representatives

Engstrøm
Birk Engstrøm (born 1950), former Norwegian football striker
Susanne Engstrøm (born 1949), Danish pharmaconomist and president of The Danish Association of Pharmaconomists

Other uses
7548 Engström, main belt asteroid with an orbital period of 5.59 years
Lars Peter Engström, character in the short story Three Versions of Judas by the Argentine author Jorge Luis Borges
Engström Motorsport, Swedish motorsport team owned by its driver Tomas Engström
USS Engstrom (DE-50), Evarts class destroyer escort constructed for the United States Navy during World War II

See also 
Enstrom, surnames and other uses

Swedish-language surnames